In the 2002 Baltimore Orioles season, the team finished 4th in the American League East with a record of 67 wins and 95 losses.

The Orioles had a record of 63–63 at the conclusion of play on August 23, but then proceeded to lose 32 of their last 36 games of the season, including their final 12 in a row.

Offseason
October 3, 2001: Tim Raines was sent to the Baltimore Orioles by the Montreal Expos as part of a conditional deal.
November 20, 2001: Izzy Molina was signed as a free agent with the Baltimore Orioles.

Regular season

Season standings

American League Wild Card

Record vs. opponents

Transactions
June 4, 2002: Adam Loewen was drafted by the Baltimore Orioles in the 1st round (4th pick) of the 2002 amateur draft. Player signed May 26, 2003.

Roster

Player stats

Batting

Starters by position
Note: Pos = Position; G = Games played; AB = At bats; H = Hits; Avg. = Batting average; HR = Home runs; RBI = Runs batted in

Other batters
Note: G = Games played; AB = At bats; H = Hits; Avg. = Batting average; HR = Home runs; RBI = Runs batted in

Pitching

Starting pitchers
Note: G = Games pitched; IP = Innings pitched; W = Wins; L = Losses; ERA = Earned run average; SO = Strikeouts

Other pitchers 
Note: G = Games pitched; IP = Innings pitched; W = Wins; L = Losses; ERA = Earned run average; SO = Strikeouts

Relief pitchers 
Note: G = Games pitched; W = Wins; L = Losses; SV = Saves; ERA = Earned run average; SO = Strikeouts

Farm system

References

2002 Baltimore Orioles team page at Baseball Reference
2002 Baltimore Orioles season at baseball-almanac.com

Baltimore Orioles seasons
Baltimore Orioles Season, 2002
Baltimore